Charles Henry Coolidge (August 4, 1921 – April 6, 2021) was a United States Army technical sergeant and a recipient of the United States military's highest decoration for valor, the Medal of Honor, for his conspicuous gallantry and intrepidity in action above and beyond the call of duty in France during World War II.

At the time of his death, Coolidge was the last surviving Medal of Honor recipient from the European theater of World War II, as well as the last surviving recipient to have received the medal during the war (with Hershel W. Williams receiving the medal after the war on October 5, 1945).

Early life
Coolidge was born in Signal Mountain, Tennessee, on August 4, 1921, the son of Walter and Grace (McCracken) Coolidge. He graduated from Chattanooga High School in 1939, and worked at his father's printing business (Chattanooga Printing & Engraving) as a bookbinder.

World War II

Coolidge was drafted into the United States Army on June 16, 1942. He received basic training at Fort McClellan in Alabama. He was then sent to Camp Butner, North Carolina and Camp Edwards in Massachusetts, where he was assigned to M Company, 3rd Battalion, 141st Infantry Regiment, 36th "Texas" Infantry Division. In April 1943, his unit was shipped overseas to Oran in Algeria, and in September took part in the Salerno landings and then continued to fight in the first half of the Italian campaign. While serving as a machine gun section leader and sergeant, he was awarded the Silver Star for gallantry in action in Italy on May 31, 1944, shortly before the capture of Rome.

On October 24, 1944, Coolidge was a technical sergeant in charge of a group of machine-gunners and riflemen of M Company, who were to hold a vital hilltop position in France near the German border. During four days of attacks at Hill 623, east of Belmont-sur-Buttant in the Vosges Mountains in France, Coolidge and his group held off numerous enemy infantrymen, plus two tanks on October 27 using grenades. One tank unsuccessfully fired five separate rounds directly at Coolidge. For his actions above and beyond the call of duty during the battle, Coolidge was presented the Medal of Honor by Lieutenant General Wade H. Haislip during a ceremony at an airfield near Dornstadt, Germany on June 18, 1945.

Post-war life
Coolidge resided near Chattanooga, Tennessee, where a highway and park have been named for him.  For many years after the war, Coolidge went to work every day at the family business, Chattanooga Printing & Engraving, which celebrated its 100th anniversary in 2010. His son, Charles H. Coolidge Jr., is a retired lieutenant general of the United States Air Force. On September 15, 2006, Coolidge was awarded the Legion of Honour by officials of the French consulate at a ceremony in Coolidge Park (named in 1945).

Coolidge was inducted into the John Sevier Chapter of the Sons of the American Revolution in March 2015. 

He was conferred with the George Marshall Award in March 2021, several weeks before his death.

Personal life
Coolidge married Frances Seepe in 1945. They remained married for 64 years until her death in 2009.  They had three children: Charles, William (Bill), and John. 

Coolidge died on April 6, 2021, in Chattanooga at the age of 99. He had suffered from multiple sclerosis in the final 50+ years of his life. He was interred at Chattanooga National Cemetery beside his wife.

Military awards
Coolidge's military awards and decorations include:

Medal of Honor citation
Coolidge's official Medal of Honor citation reads:

Rank and organization: Technical Sergeant, U.S. Army, Company M, 141st Infantry, 36th Infantry Division
Place and date: East of Belmont sur Buttant, France, October 24–27, 1944
Entered service at: Signal Mountain, Tenn.
G.O. No. 53, July 1945

Other honors
 In November 2013, Coolidge's was the first one of 12 portraits of Medal of Honor recipients on the cover sheet of a United States Postal Service "World War II Medal of Honor Forever Stamp" packet of 20 Medal of Honor stamps.
The Charles H. Coolidge Medal of Honor Heritage Center in downtown Chattanooga, Tennessee, was named in his honor. It opened to the public in February 2020.
Coolidge Park, located in downtown Chattanooga on the northshore waterfront, was named in his honor. The park features a restored 1894 Dentzel carousel, a pavilion, an interactive play fountain, the Outdoor Chattanooga Center and much open space. It is a popular destination for concerts, outdoor film screenings, festivals and special events.
A nine-mile portion of U.S. Route 27 (Tennessee Route 29) in Hamilton County, Tennessee was renamed the Charles H. Coolidge Medal of Honor Highway and was dedicated in his honor on April 10, 1989.

See also

List of Medal of Honor recipients for World War II

References

External links

1921 births
2021 deaths
Military personnel from Tennessee
People from Chattanooga, Tennessee
People from Signal Mountain, Tennessee
Recipients of the Legion of Honour
Recipients of the Silver Star
Sons of the American Revolution
United States Army Medal of Honor recipients
United States Army personnel of World War II
United States Army non-commissioned officers
World War II recipients of the Medal of Honor